1373 can refer to:

The year 1373
United Nations Security Council Resolution 1373
1373 Cincinnati, an asteroid